Babakot is a large village in Kasur District, southwestern Pakistan, in the province of Balochistan. 

Populated places in Kasur District